Admiral Atwell Peregrine MacLeod Lake (11 April 1842 – 27 August 1915) was a Royal Navy officer who became Senior Officer, Coast of Ireland Station.

Family
Lake was born in 1842. Henry Atwell Lake was his father and Sir James Samuel William Lake, 4th Baronet was his grandfather. Sir Atwell Henry Lake, 9th Baronet was his son.

Naval career
Lake became commanding officer of the cruiser HMS Nelson in January 1885, commanding officer of the cruiser HMS Orlando in May 1888 and commanding officer of HMS Nelson again in August 1888.
 He went on to be Captain of the Royal Naval College, Greenwich in February 1889, Flag Officer, Gibraltar in January 1892, Captain, Fleet Reserve, Portsmouth in March 1895 and Senior Officer, Coast of Ireland Station from January 1898 until February 1901. He was promoted to vice admiral on 9 September 1901, and retired from the navy at his own request on 1 July 1902. He received promotion to Admiral on the Retired list on 24 May 1905.

References

1842 births
1915 deaths
Royal Navy admirals